Tzum is a village in Waadhoeke municipality in the province of Friesland, the Netherlands. It had a population of around 1,164 in January 2014. Tzum is known for its 72 metre tall church tower.

History
The village was first mentioned in 1222 as Chzimingen, and means "settlement of Tsjumme (person)". Tzum is a terp (artificial living hill) village from the beginning of our era.

The Dutch Reformed church has a 12th century nave with a 14th century choir. The tower burnt down in 1547, and also the church was severely damaged. A new tower was built between 1548 and 1549 which took - according to legend - exactly 12 months, 12 days and 12 hours. The tower measures  and was the tallest church tower in Friesland until the construction of the Saint Boniface church in Leeuwarden.

Tzum was home to 633 people in 1840. In 1896, a dairy factory opened in Tzum. After World War II, it developed into a commuter village of Franeker.
Up to 2018, the village was part of the Franekeradeel municipality.

Notable people 
 Johannes Belksma (1884–1942), missionary
 Renier van Tzum was born in the village. He was the opperhoofd or chief factor of the Dutch East India Company (Vereenigde Oost-Indische Compagnie or VOC) in Siam (1643-1644). He was also VOC opperhoofd in Japan (1644-1646).

Gallery

References

External links

Waadhoeke
Populated places in Friesland